Danil Vyacheslavovich Ustimenko (born 8 August 2000) is a Kazakh footballer who plays as a goalkeeper for Kairat.

Club career
Ustimenko made his professional debut for Kairat in the Kazakhstan Premier League on 1 July 2020, starting in the home match against Zhetysu, which finished as a 3–0 win.

References

External links
 
 
 
 

2000 births
Living people
Sportspeople from Almaty
Kazakhstani footballers
Kazakhstan youth international footballers
Association football goalkeepers
FC Kairat players
Kazakhstan Premier League players